Neocecidothrips is a genus of thrips in the family Phlaeothripidae, first described by Richard Siddoway Bagnall in 1929.

Species
 Neocecidothrips bursariae
 Neocecidothrips curviseta

References

Phlaeothripidae
Thrips
Thrips genera